The Bavarian Class Pt 2/5 H locomotive of the Royal Bavarian State Railways (Königlich Bayerische Staatsbahn) was built by Krauss for the Nuremberg Trade Fair in 1906. Because this locomotive could no longer fully meet the performance requirements at that time, it remained a one-off. It was nevertheless taken over by the Reichsbahn and retired in 1933. The loco had a superheated steam system.

The engine was scrapped after retirement.

See also 
 Royal Bavarian State Railways 
 List of Bavarian locomotives and railbuses

References

2-4-4T locomotives
Pt 2 5 H
Standard gauge locomotives of Germany
Railway locomotives introduced in 1906
Scrapped locomotives 
Passenger locomotives